The Mary Tyler Moore Reunion is a 2002 American television special celebrating the classic 1970–1977 sitcom The Mary Tyler Moore Show. It was broadcast on CBS on Monday, May 13, 2002 from 10:00 to 11:00 p.m. ET/PT.

Summary
Mary Tyler Moore hosts a retrospective of The Mary Tyler Moore Show and conducts one-on-one interviews with surviving cast members Ed Asner, Gavin MacLeod, Betty White, Valerie Harper, Cloris Leachman and Georgia Engel, to reminisce about their time together on the show and featuring a montage of clips from past episodes. A special tribute segment to the late Ted Knight is also included with memorable scenes highlighting his character as Ted Baxter.

During the special, Mary reveals the result of an online poll conducted by CBS.com where fans were asked to vote for their favorite Mary Tyler Moore episode and the winner is "Chuckles Bites the Dust". The opening title sequence features the 1996 remake of the show's theme song "Love Is All Around" performed by Joan Jett & The Blackhearts.

Cast
 Mary Tyler Moore
 Ed Asner
 Gavin MacLeod
 Betty White
 Valerie Harper
 Cloris Leachman
 Georgia Engel

See also
Mary and Rhoda
Mary Tyler Moore: The 20th Anniversary Show

References

External links

The Mary Tyler Moore Show
2002 television specials
2000s American television specials
CBS television specials
Television series reunion specials